Woodlands Wellington Football Club is an inactive professional football club which played in the S.League, the top division of football in Singapore. They are based in Woodlands at the 4,300 seater Woodlands Stadium, where they have played since their establishment.

Woodlands Wellington FC's honours include winning the inaugural Singapore League Cup in 2007, defeating Sengkang Punggol FC 4–0 in the final. They also finished runners-up in the Singapore FA Cup in 1997, and also in the Singapore Cup in 2005 and 2008 and won the President's Centennial Cup in 1998, a cup competition organized by the Philippine Football Federation to celebrate the centennial of Philippine Independence by defeating Hong Kong Rangers FC 2–1 in the final in Bacolod.

Their best finish in the S-League came in the 1996 Tiger Beer Series where they were runners-up. They have also achieved 3rd place in 1997 and 2005.

Woodlands Wellington FC planned to merge with Hougang United but the merger never happened. Woodlands Wellington FC plays in Island Wide League and they plan to re-join S-League in the future.

History

Wellington Football Club (1988–1996)
Woodlands Wellington was founded as Wellington Football Club in 1988 as a splinter group of Delhi Juniors (a team of Singaporean football enthusiasts, dating back to the 1940s, that were among the pioneers of football in Singapore). The name stems from the Deptford Ground located on Wellington Road in Sembawang where the team started playing football in 1988.

In 1991, they participated in the Sembawang Group League and National Island-Wide League, winning as champions in both competitions and setting a national record by beating Seletar Football Club by a 27-goal margin. This was one of the biggest wins the club had ever achieved, as they beat their opponents 28 – 1 at the Woodlands Stadium on 17 November 1991. Amalar Louis scored a record 12 goals in that match.

The following year, Wellington FC joined the Singapore National Football League in Division 2, from which they were promoted as champions in 1994. The following season they finished first in Division 1 (going unbeaten for 24 matches) and were runners-up in the FA Cup.

Woodlands Wellington Football Club (1996–2014)
Wellington Football Club were selected as one of eight clubs to compete in the newly formed S.League in its inaugural season in 1996, prompting the club to adopt Woodlands Stadium as their home ground and to change their name to Woodlands Wellington Football Club.

Following their admission to the S.League, Wellington FC's founder, R. Vengadasalam, was appointed as the Team Manager of Woodlands Wellington and Bandai were announced as a sponsor in their maiden season in the S.League. Following this, they signed Jan Janostak, Joe Caleta and Ervin Boban, from the M-League, as well as Singapore national players Borhan Abu Samah, Tamil Marren, Zakaria Awang, from England Notts County legend Darren Davis and Croatian goalkeeper Sandro Radun, who played for the Singapore FA in 1992. Woodlands Wellington played to capacity crowds, including their pre-season friendlies.

Woodlands won the President's Centennial Cup in 1998, a cup competition organized by the Philippine Football Federation to celebrate the centennial of Philippine Independence, beating Sembawang Rangers 4–2 in the semi-final and Hong Kong Rangers FC 2–1 at the Negros Occidental Sports Complex in the final in Bacolod with both goals from Razali Ahmad.

While they enjoyed a relatively successful period throughout the late nineties, Woodlands finished last in the 2001 S.League season, prompting them to sign Singapore internationals Zulkarnaen Zainal, Goh Tat Chuan and A. Siva Kumar. The transfers of Goh and Siva Kumar were particularly controversial as Woodlands and Jurong were well-known rivals in the league.

Woodlands Wellington made the headlines in the 2007 S.League season for a walkout by the entire Woodlands squad in a match against Tampines Rovers as a protest to the decisions made against them by referee P. Pandian. Woodlands were fined $30,000 for the incident and had six points docked. Tampines coach Vorawan Chitavanich was reported as saying "I spoke to their coach just a little while ago and he said that they acted on the instructions of their club chairman."

Reported withdrawal from the S. League

A report by The New Paper on 22 November 2012 suggested that Woodlands may be in financial trouble and could be the second club to sit out the 2013 S.League after Gombak United has announced earlier that it would not be taking part in the league in 2013. This sparked off a supporter-driven "Save Woodlands" awareness campaign on the same day. The club held an open meeting with the supporters and press at Woodlands Stadium later that evening and quashed the report. Team manager, Matthew Tay, also said that the club was already preparing a pre-season tour of Malaysia, and that the club would be signing players and would also be aiming for a minimum 8th spot in the table this season.

Merger with Hougang United

In November 2014, it was announced that Woodlands Wellington and Hougang United will merge for the 2015 season and a new club name will be used.

However, the merge never occurred and the club now plays in 2016 Island Wide League. The club plans to re-join S-League in the future.

Stadium
 Woodlands Stadium is currently the home ground of Woodlands Wellington, and used mostly for football matches. Apart from being used for competitive matches, the pitch is also utilised by the club for their training sessions as well.

Logo and mascot

Colours

As Wellington Football Club, the team played in a white kit with purple and green trimmings. As soon as they were rebranded into the Woodlands Wellington Football Club in 1996, the Rams changed their home kit to all white with a narrow stripe of yellow and green down the middle.

In the ensuing years, yellow was employed as the main colour of choice for the home kit and this has become the traditional colour for the club.

Kit evolution
 Home

 Away

 Third / Special

*The third kit for 2007 was used as the home kit of the 2008 season.

Continental record

Sponsors
Woodlands Wellington FC was sponsored by Bandai from 1996 to 1998, after which it was sponsored by Sembcorp from 2001 to 2010. The club went without a sponsor from 2011 to 2012 before Singaporean equity company, ESW, took up the sponsorship of the Rams from March 2013.

The team is presently outfitted by Singaporean kit makers, Waga, for the 2013 season. Their previous kit sponsors include Lotto, Kappa, Diadora, Umbro, Mitre and Thai apparel makers, Acono.

Club

Coaching staff
{|class="wikitable"
|-
|-
! Position !! Name
|-
|Team manager ||  Bruce Tan
|-
|Head coach ||  Salim Moin
|-
|Assistant / Prime League Coach||  Hatta Ali
|-
|Fitness Trainer ||  Luka Lalic
|-
|Kitman ||  Wan Azlan Wan Adanan
|-

Youth academy
The youth academy of Woodlands is the Centre of Excellence, which develops promising young players and grooms them for the future.

Manager history

 Steve Wicks (1996)
 Dean Wheatley (1997–98)
 V. Sivalingam (1999)
 Ivan Raznevich (2000–01)
 M. Karathu (2002–03)
 Simon Clark (2003–04) – Player / Coach
 Maff Brown (2005)
 Karim Bencherifa (1 Jan 2005 – 30 June 2006)
 Jörg Steinebrunner (2006–08)
 Nenad Bacina (1 Jan 2009 – 31 Dec 2009)
 A. Shasi Kumar (1 Jan 2010 – 31 Dec 2010)
 R. Balasubramaniam (1 Jan 2011 – 12 Jan 2012)
 Salim Moin (13 Jan 2012 – 28 Nov 2013)
 Darren Stewart (14 Jan 2014 – 15 June 2014)
 Salim Moin (15 June 2014 – 31 December 2014)

Honours

Domestic
Cup
 Singapore League Cup: 1
 2007

International
Cup
 President's Centennial Cup: 1
 1998

Performance in domestic competitions

 The 1996 season of the S.League was split into two series. Tiger Beer Series winners Geylang United defeated Pioneer Series winners Singapore Armed Forces in the Championship playoff to clinch the S.League title.
 2003 saw the introduction of penalty shoot-outs if a match ended in a draw in regular time. Winners of penalty shoot-outs gained two points instead of one.
 Woodlands Wellington deducted 6 points for abandoning a match on 5 September 2007.

Last updated on 15 May 2014

Supporters' Club
The supporters' club of Woodlands Wellington Football Club are known as The Black Sheep. They can be seen at both home and away games dressed in the club's official colours of yellow and blue and are usually seated behind the Rams' dugout. Since its inception, The Black Sheep have been using the warcry "Never Surrender!" to rally their players on.

References

External links
 Official club website
 S.League website page on Woodlands Wellington FC

 
Football clubs in Singapore
1988 establishments in Singapore
Singapore Premier League clubs
Association football clubs established in 1988